Events from the year 1781 in Denmark.

Incumbents
 Monarch – Christian VII
 Prime minister – Ove Høegh-Guldberg

Events

 18 June  The county of Lindenborg is established by Heinrich Carl von Schimmelmann from the manors of Lindenborg, Gudumlund, Vildmosegaard, Tiendegården, Henriksdal, Louisendal and Thoruphedegård.
Kilder

Births 

 2 January – Frederik Michael Ernst Fabritius de Tengnagel, military officer and landscape painter (died 1849)
 12 June – Anne Marie Mangor, cookbook writer (died 1865)
 2 July – Erich Christian Werlauff, historian (died 1871)
 12 October – Ludvig Mariboe, Norwegian businessman, publisher and politician (died 1841)
 11 November – Bernt Wilhelm Westermann, businessman (died 1868)

Deaths
 22 February – Anna Magdalena Godiche, publisher (born 1721)
 17 March – Johannes Ewald, dramatist, poet (born 1743)
 10 April – Reinhard Iselin, businessperson (born 1714 in Switzerland)
 30 August – Georg David Anthon, architect (born 1714 in the Holy Roman Empire)

References

 
Years of the 18th century in Denmark
Denmark
Denmark
1780s in Denmark